Alfredo De Massis is an Italian management and organization scientist who researches managerial, behavioural and organizational issues in the context of family enterprises. He is Full Professor of Family Business and Entrepreneurship at the Free University of Bozen-Bolzano (Italy) where he is the Director of the Centre for Family Business Management. He is also affiliated with Lancaster University (UK) where he co-directs the Centre for Family Business of Lancaster University Management School. According to Family Capital, De Massis is among the top 25 star professors of family business in the world 

De Massis also serves as strategy consultant, executive advisor and coach to family enterprises in a variety of industries. According to his CV, this includes Accenture Strategy, SCS Consulting, and Borsa Italiana (London Stock Exchange Group). In 2017, he shared his experience about succession and family business management with the UK Parliament.

In 2016, several newspapers and TV programmes reported in 2016 that De Massis was the youngest full professor in Italy.

Research 
De Massis has been a guest editor of ten special issues on family business- and strategy-related topics in journals like Strategic Management Journal, Journal of Management Studies,  Entrepreneurship Theory and Practice, Journal of Product Innovation Management, Global Strategy Journal, California Management Review, and Long Range Planning. His research has been featured in various media outlets including Financial Times, Harvard Business Review, CNBC, Campden FB, Tharawat Magazine, The Conversation, Il Sole 24 ORE, and he is regularly interviewed in TV programmes (e.g., “Porta a Porta”, a TV program hosted by the Italian journalist Bruno Vespa, which is broadcast on RAI1, Italy’s leading national channel, and has played a central role in the Italian political scene), newspapers and magazines on family business and entrepreneurship issues.

References

External links 
 Faculty page

Living people
Academic journal editors
Italian business theorists
Academic staff of the Free University of Bozen-Bolzano
Year of birth missing (living people)